Jerry Batista is a Puerto Rican basketball coach for the Puerto Rican national team.

References

Living people
Olympic coaches
Puerto Rican basketball coaches
Year of birth missing (living people)